The men's 5000 metres event at the 1977 Summer Universiade was held at the Vasil Levski National Stadium in Sofia on 21 and 23 August.

Medalists

Results

Heats

Final

References

Athletics at the 1977 Summer Universiade
1977